Nader Habibi is an Iranian-American economist and Henry J. Leir Professor of Practice in the Economics of the Middle East at Brandeis University.

Career
Habibi received his PhD in Economics from Michigan State University in 1987. Since then, He has served in academic and research institutions in Iran, Turkey and the United States. Before joining Brandeis University in June 2007, he worked at Global Insight Ltd as managing director of economic forecasting and risk analysis for Middle East and North Africa.
Habibi is a member of the board of directors of Hollings Center and a founding member of International Iranian Economic Association.

Books
 Three Stories One Middle East. Waltham: Self-published, 2014, ISBN 9781501031083
 Atul's Quest. 2014

References

External links
Nader Habibi
The Iranian Economy in the Shadow of Economic Sanctions

Living people
Iranian economists
American economists
Michigan State University alumni
Brandeis University faculty
Year of birth missing (living people)